The second cabinet of Ion C. Brătianu ruled Romania from 24 November 1878 to 10 July 1879.

Ministers
The ministers of the cabinet were as follows:

President of the Council of Ministers:
Ion C. Brătianu (24 November 1878 – 10 July 1879)
Minister of the Interior: 
Ion C. Brătianu (24 November 1878 – 10 July 1879)
Minister of Foreign Affairs: 
Ion Câmpineanu (24 November 1878 – 10 July 1879)
Minister of Finance:
Dimitrie A. Sturdza (24 November 1878 – 10 July 1879)
Minister of Justice:
Eugeniu Stătescu (24 November 1878 – 10 July 1879)
Minister of War:
(interim) Ion C. Brătianu (24 November 1878 – 8 January 1879)
Col. Nicolae Dabija (8 January 1879 – 10 July 1879)
Minister of Religious Affairs and Public Instruction:
George Cantilli  (24 November 1878 – 10 July 1879)
Minister of Public Works:
Mihail Pherekyde (24 November 1878 – 10 July 1879)

References

Bratianu, I. 2
Cabinets established in 1878
Cabinets disestablished in 1879
1878 establishments in Romania
1879 disestablishments in Romania